Sadiq Al-Mohsin (born 23 October 1997) is a Saudi Arabian handball player for Khaleej and the Saudi Arabian national team.

He participated at the 2017 World Men's Handball Championship.

References

1997 births
Living people
Saudi Arabian male handball players
Handball players at the 2018 Asian Games
Asian Games competitors for Saudi Arabia
20th-century Saudi Arabian people
21st-century Saudi Arabian people